Four Lads Who Shook the Wirral is the seventh album by Wirral-based UK rock band Half Man Half Biscuit (HMHB), released in June 1998.

Critical reception 
 Stewart Mason, AllMusic: "Half Man Half Biscuit released this album within one calendar year of its predecessor, 1997's Voyage to the Bottom of the Road [...], and perhaps that accounts for the somewhat lackluster feel. [...] [T]here is enough of interest here to appeal to the converted, but newcomers should perhaps start elsewhere."
 Simon Williams, NME: "Chances of cracking open the notoriously fickle American market: slimmer than Lena Zavaroni's mop handle."

Track listing

Notes 
 The album title is a parody of a phrase associated with The Beatles, "Four lads who shook the world", referring instead to the band's origin in Wirral.
 Techstep is a subgenre of drum and bass that was popular in the late 1990s.
 Wensum is a river in Norfolk.
 A split single is a single which includes tracks by two or more separate artists.
 A Country Practice was a multi-Logie award-winning Australian television serial/drama series 198193.
 Goa is a state located in the southwestern region of India, formerly a Portuguese colony, known as a destination for hippies.
 "Keeping Two Chevrons Apart" refers to the official UK motorway road sign "Keep Apart 2 Chevrons", advising drivers of safe distances between vehicles; the song title is quoted in "Lord Hereford's Knob" on the 2008 album CSI:Ambleside.

References

External links 
 Four Lads Who Shook the Wirral at the longest-established fan website
 Four Lads Who Shook the Wirral at the Half man Half Biscuit Lyrics Project

1998 albums
Half Man Half Biscuit albums